The 2012 FIBA Europe Under-20 Championship for Women was the 11th edition of the FIBA Europe Under-20 Championship for Women. 16 teams participated in the competition, held at the Főnix Hall and Stadion Oláh Gábor Út in Debrecen, Hungary, from 16 to 26 August 2012.

Participating teams

  (Runners-up, 2011 FIBA Europe Under-20 Championship for Women Division B)

  (Winners, 2011 FIBA Europe Under-20 Championship for Women Division B)

Final standings

References

External links
Official Site

2012
2012–13 in European women's basketball
2012–13 in Hungarian basketball
International women's basketball competitions hosted by Hungary
International youth basketball competitions hosted by Hungary
2012 in youth sport